The Hutchinson HS-127 is an American mid-wing  glider that was designed and built by Vernon Hutchinson.

Design and development
The HS-127 was designed and built by Hutchinson in 1956 as a single seat, V-tailed aircraft that incorporated spoilers mounted in the fuselage sides, above the wing roots. The aircraft was constructed from aluminium and employed a NACA 65 (3)-618 airfoil.

In 1960 Hutchinson constructed a new fuselage for the aircraft with two seats in tandem and a conventional tail. The wings from the earlier single seat fuselage were used on the new fuselage. The designer incorporated split trailing edge dive brakes and claims this was the first use of balanced trailing edge dive brakes. Both versions of the aircraft bore the same Federal Aviation Administration aircraft registration, N62P.

The aircraft's HS designation indicates Hutchinson Sailplane.

Operational history
Hutchinson completed his Silver badge and Gold badge while flying the HS-127 and also flew a number of  flights in it. In May 2011 the aircraft was still registered to Hutchinson, 55 years after its completion.

Specifications (HS-127 two seater)

See also

References

1950s United States sailplanes
Homebuilt aircraft
Aircraft first flown in 1956
V-tail aircraft